Visitacion Valley (Spanish: Valle de la Visitación), colloquially referred to as Viz Valley, is a neighborhood located in the southeastern quadrant of San Francisco, California.

Visitacion Valley is roughly defined by McLaren Park and Gleneagles Golf Course to the West, Mansell Blvd and Portola to the north, Bayview Hill and Candlestick Cove to the east, and the San Francisco / San Mateo County line to the south. The streets of this neighborhood straddle the border between San Francisco and Daly City, hence partially blending with the adjacent Daly City neighborhood of Bayshore. The grounds of the Cow Palace, straddling the San Francisco/Daly City border, are partially within Visitacion Valley.

Name

Visitacion Valley takes its name from Rancho Cañada de Guadalupe la Visitación y Rodeo Viejo, a large tract of land that also included the Bayshore district of Daly City, the city of Brisbane, and San Bruno Mountain.

The term "Visitacion" is Spanish and a reference to the Visitation in Luke 1:39 of the Bible. It is a visit by Mary, bearing the child Jesus, to her cousin Elizabeth, who despite her advanced years is pregnant with John the Baptist. John leapt in the womb as Mary entered, knowing that he is in the presence of the Savior.

History
The area is a largely family-oriented working-class neighborhood. Average incomes and rents for the area are much lower than the citywide average. The area was originally settled by Irish, Spaniard American, Italian immigrants who worked in the nearby factories, as well as for Southern Pacific Railroad. The neighborhood once had the largest Maltese population outside of Malta. The construction of the nearby Hunters Point Naval Shipyard during World War II, led to a massive influx of African Americans who worked in the shipyards. Many settled in the Sunnydale Projects which were originally constructed as barracks to house workers. After the war ended, more African Americans relocated from the Fillmore District and the Western Addition because the Urban Renewal program uprooted them and their businesses, demolished the neighborhood for the City’s financial gain, and as a small consolation: redevelopment programs provided inexpensive housing. Also, African Americans choice of residency was very limited at the time. Many landlords would not rent to African Americans and/or would inflate rent for African Americans. The area still has a 15% African American population; however, this number has been declining in recent years due to the rising cost of living in San Francisco and black flight to the East Bay area. The Black population is being supplanted by rising rent prices, set by landlords who seek to make more profits than longtime residents can afford to pay.  

The former army barracks turned housing projects on Sunnydale Avenue, the Sunnydale Projects, is the largest in San Francisco and remains one of the most violent areas of the city. The two high-rise apartment buildings, Geneva Towers, originally built as private housing in the 1960s, were converted to public housing in the 1970s. They suffered through dilapidation and poor maintenance throughout the 1980s and were plagued by gangs and drug activity. The City ordered the destruction of the buildings in 1998 and replaced them with lower-density units. Since the crackdown on crack cocaine in the mid-1990s and the demolition of the Geneva Towers public housing complex, crime in the neighborhood has been reduced, though many of the same problems remain. The Chinese American residency has grown and more businesses have opened on Leland Avenue.

Characteristics 
The St. James Presbyterian Church was erected at 240 Leland Avenue in 1906. The current building was built in 1923 and designed by San Francisco Bay Area native architect Julia Morgan.

In 1907, Archbishop Patrick William Riordan established a new parish in the Visitacion Valley. The original church was built on Cora Street, between Sunnydale and Visitacion avenues. In 1909, the church was located at the corner of Loehr Street and Visitacion Avenue. The third church was located between Raymond Avenue and Delta Street, using the material from the second church. The current Church of the Visitacion is located at 655 Sunnydale Avenue, which has been there since at least 1961. The Our Lady of the Visitacion School private Catholic K–8 school is located on the premises. Its student population is close to 50% Filipino Americans. Former California governor Peter Hardeman Burnett's house was also on the premises, on what was then called Burnet Grove. The house was later torn down to make way for the construction of the school.

The neighborhood was featured in the 2004 television film Sucker Free City.

The annual Visitacion Valley Festival, a street fair hosted along the commercial Leland Avenue and organized by the volunteer group Visitacion Valley Connections, began in 2006.

The Visitacion Valley Community Center began printing the free Visitacion Valley Grapevine community newspaper in 1986. It had a 25-year run and ceased production in 2011 due to statewide budget cuts.

Recent developments 
The Visitacion Valley Redevelopment Area for the area centering at Leland Avenue and Bayshore Boulevard, including the former Schlage Lock Factory, was adopted by the Board of Supervisors in April 2009. Home Depot proposed to build a big box store in March 2000. This proposal was dropped in January 2001 after opposition by neighborhood interests and local politicians. The San Francisco Board of Supervisors approved interim rezoning to low-density commercial in January 2001. A transit-oriented mixed-use development (Visitacion Valley TOD Project) will be constructed on the former Schlage Lock Factory and Southern Pacific Rail Yard following demolition of existing buildings, except for the Historic Office Building, and brownfield remediation, which started after Remediation Action Plan was approved on November 16, 2009. This project will feature a grocery store, condos, parks, and other new redevelopment designed to revitalize the neighborhood. Due to local redevelopment budgets all across California being cut by Governor Jerry Brown, development was delayed until 2014 and construction is currently expected to finish by 2021.

Redevelopment also came in the construction of a new Muni Metro line called the T Third Street, which terminates at Sunnydale Station. The extension into the neighborhood is part of a major project to ultimately extend Muni to the northeast section of the city, thus granting easy and faster access for the neighborhood's Chinese residents to Chinatown and for future development along Third Street.

The old Visitacion Valley Branch of the San Francisco Public Library was leased out of a small storefront at 45 Leland Ave. The new, permanent branch is now closer to Visitacion Valley Elementary School. It opened on July 30, 2011 at 201 Leland Ave, at the site of the former Super Fair Market.

Education

Elementary 

 Visitacion Valley Elementary School
 El Dorado Elementary School

Middle school 

 Visitacion Valley Middle School
 Our Lady of the Visitacion School (K–8)

Notable past residents 

Peter Hardeman Burnett, California governor (1849–1851)
Rikishi (Solofa F. Fatu Jr.), American professional wrestler
Dan White, San Francisco supervisor who assassinated Supervisor Harvey Milk and Mayor George Moscone in 1978

Gallery

References

External links

Visitacion Valley TOD Project
Visitacion Valley Community Development Corporation
San Francisco Visitacion Valley
Visitacion Valley Branch Library
 Visitacion Valley Facebook Fan's Page

Neighborhoods in San Francisco